Ochsenkopf, German for "ox's head", may refer to:

 Ochsenkopf (Malbun), a mountain on the border of Liechtenstein and Austria
 Ochsenkopf (Fichtel Mountains), a mountain in Upper Franconia, Bavaria
 Ochsenkopf (Jägerhaus), a mountain of Saxony, southeastern Germany
 Ochsenkopf (Rittersgrün), a mountain of Saxony, southeastern Germany
 Ochsenkopf (Kitzbühel Alps), a mountain of the Alps
 Ochsenkopf Transmitter, a radio and TV transmitter for the Bayerischer Rundfunk

See also
 Hoher Ochsenkopf, a mountain in the Black Forest, Baden-Württemberg